Harry Mitchell is a former U.S. Representative.

Harry Mitchell may also refer to:

Harry Mitchell (boxer) (1898–1983), English boxer 
Harry Mitchell (brewer) (1862–1894), managing director of Mitchells & Butlers Brewery
Harry Mitchell, a character in 52 Pick-Up
Harry Mitchell, a character in The Adjustment Bureau

See also
Harold Mitchell (disambiguation)
Henry Mitchell (disambiguation)